The 1973–74 VfL Bochum season was the 36th season in club history.

Review and events

Matches

Legend

Bundesliga

DFB-Pokal

Squad

Squad and statistics

Squad, appearances and goals scored

Transfers

Summer

In:

Out:

Winter

In:

Out:

References

External links 
 1973–74 VfL Bochum season at Weltfussball.de 
 1973–74 VfL Bochum season at kicker.de 
 1973–74 VfL Bochum season at Fussballdaten.de 

Bochum
VfL Bochum seasons